The Bridge of the Gods is a steel truss cantilever bridge that spans the Columbia River between Cascade Locks, Oregon, and Washington state near North Bonneville. It is a toll bridge operated by the Port of Cascade Locks.

The Columbia River Bridge Company of Spokane, Washington, acquired ownership of the bridge in 1953 for $735,000 (equivalent to $ today). The Port of Cascade Locks purchased the bridge with $950,000 (or $ today) in revenue bonds, issued on November 1, 1961. The Port of Cascade Locks Commission owns and operates the bridge still today.

The bridge is named after the historic geologic feature also known as Bridge of the Gods.

The Pacific Crest Trail crosses the Columbia River on the Bridge of the Gods.

Onlookers in September 1927 saw Charles Lindbergh fly the Spirit of St. Louis from Portland low over the new bridge and then, in a bit of barnstorming, make a 180 degree turn and fly back under the bridge, continuing to the Portland Airport, then on Swan Island.

The bridge toll increased to $2 per crossing due to the increased traffic after the release of the 2014 film Wild.

See also
List of crossings of the Columbia River

References

External links
 
 One site on the modern-day Bridge of the Gods
 Port of Cascade Locks official site
  http://www.gatheringthestories.org/2013/11/25/charles-lindbergh-and-the-bridge-of-the-gods/
 Youtube video

1926 establishments in Oregon
Bridges completed in 1926
Bridges over the Columbia River
Transportation buildings and structures in Hood River County, Oregon
Transportation buildings and structures in Skamania County, Washington
Columbia River Gorge
Road bridges in Oregon
Road bridges in Washington (state)
Toll bridges in Oregon
Toll bridges in Washington (state)
1926 establishments in Washington (state)
Steel bridges in the United States
Cantilever bridges in the United States